XHYU-FM is a radio station on 100.1 FM in Mérida, Yucatán, Mexico. It is owned by Grupo SIPSE and carries Amor romantic format.

History
XHYU received its concession on February 19, 1993. It was owned by Mensaje Radiofónico, S.A., a subsidiary of Radiorama, and slated to broadcast on 100.9 MHz. Within five years, Radiorama had sold XHYU to Grupo ACIR. In 2012, ACIR would sell ownership of its Mérida stations to SIPSE, which continues to program XHYU and XHMT-FM 98.5 with similar formats with identical names.

References

Radio stations in Yucatán
Radio stations established in 1993